The Laa River is a river in Sulawesi, Indonesia, about 1700 km northeast of the capital Jakarta.

Hydrology 
The Laa River empties into the Gulf of Mori. The Ta Pamona live along the river as well as the To Mori, who settled on the lower section of the river.

Geography
The river flows in the eastern area of Sulawesi which has a predominantly tropical rainforest climate (designated as Af in the Köppen-Geiger climate classification). The annual average temperature in the area is 23 °C. The warmest month is February, when the average temperature is around 26 °C, and the coldest is July, at 21 °C. The average annual rainfall is 4154 mm. The wettest month is April, with an average of 522 mm rainfall, and the driest is October, with 94 mm rainfall.

See also
List of rivers of Indonesia
List of rivers of Sulawesi
Poso River
Lake Poso

References

Rivers of Central Sulawesi
Rivers of Indonesia